Mineshaft is an independent international art magazine launched in 1999 by Everett Rand and Gioia Palmieri in Guilford, Vermont. Initially focusing on poetry and literature, the magazine began to publish comics after Robert Crumb became a contributor in 2000. The newsblog at The Guardian refers to Mineshaft'''s website as a source to find out more about Crumb's latest work.

 History Mineshaft was the idea of Everett Rand who was inspired by his friendship and correspondence with Irving Stettner, who published the legendary underground magazine, Stroker, which featured contributions from Henry Miller and Paul Bowles. The name for the magazine came from Rand's favorite bar in La Paz, Bolivia where he and co-editor, Gioia Palmieri, lived in the early 1990s.

The first issue featured a drawing by Stettner. After issue #4, Rand wrote to Robert Crumb who responded by sending a packet of sketchbook drawings. After issue #5, Crumb designed logos for the magazine which Mineshaft has been using ever since. Crumb's regular contributions include fourteen front covers, sixteen back covers and a total to date of more than 240 pages of artwork, writing, and letters. After living and publishing Mineshaft in Vermont and West Virginia, the editors, Rand and Palmieri, moved their operations to Durham, North Carolina.

The magazine currently publishes new or previously unpublished material from some of the major artists of the underground comix movement, as well as other items which include fiction, poetry, photography and short essays. Since 2009, Mineshaft has been serializing "Excerpts from R. Crumb's Dream Diary" by Robert Crumb.    In the fall of 2017, Mineshaft published The Mineshaft Reader with front cover art and design by Robert Crumb containing new and old work from regular contributors including Robert Crumb, Billy Childish, Mary Fleener, and Jay Lynch.

Mineshaft contributors

 Robert Armstrong
 Ace Backwords
 Peter Bagge
 Brutalists: Ben Myers, Tony O'Neill, Adelle Stripe
 Charles Bukowski
 Nina Bunjevac
 Billy Childish
 Andrei Codrescu
 David Collier
 William Crook, Jr.
 Robert Crumb
 Aline Kominsky Crumb
 Sophie Crumb
 Kim Deitch
 Simon Deitch
 Diane di Prima
 Luca Donnini
 Dennis Eichhorn
 Mary Fleener
 Justin Green
 Bill Griffith
 J.R. Helton
 Jay Kinney
 Aaron Lange
 Jay Lynch
 Pat Moriarity
 Christoph Mueller
 James G. Mundie
 Harvey Pekar
 Ed Piskor
 Peter Poplaski
 John Porcellino
 Jeremy Reed
 Spain Rodriguez
 Noah Van Sciver
 Tara Seibel
 Bruce Simon
 Art Spiegelman
 Frank Stack
 Irving Stettner
 Tommy Trantino (Thomas Trantino)
 Carol Tyler
 Skip Williamson
 Aleksandar Zograf

Mineshaft cover artists
 Mineshaft #1 Irving Stettner (1999)
 Mineshaft #2 Everett Rand (photo) (1999)
 Mineshaft #3 Tommy Trantino (Thomas Trantino) (2000)
 Mineshaft #4 Everett Rand (photo collage) (2000)
 Mineshaft #5 Robert Crumb (2000)
 Mineshaft #6 Robert Crumb (2001)
 Mineshaft #7 Robert Crumb (2001)
 Mineshaft #8 Jorin Ostroska (2002)
 Mineshaft #9 Robert Crumb (2002)
 Mineshaft #10 Robert Crumb (2003)
 Mineshaft #11 Robert Crumb (2003)
 Mineshaft #12 Kim Deitch with logo by Robert Crumb (2003)
 Mineshaft #13 Robert Crumb (2004)
 Mineshaft #14 Phoebe Gloeckner with logo by Robert Crumb (2004)
 Mineshaft #15 Robert Crumb (2005)
 Mineshaft #16 Robert Armstrong (2005)
 Mineshaft #17 Frank Stack with logo by Robert Crumb (2006)
 Mineshaft #18 Simon Deitch (2006)
 Mineshaft #19 Peter Bagge (2007)
 Mineshaft #20 Billy Childish (2007)
 Mineshaft #21 Robert Crumb (2008)
 Mineshaft #22 Robert Armstrong and Orrin J. Heller (2008)
 Mineshaft #23 Jay Lynch (2008)
 Mineshaft #24 Mary Fleener (2009)
 Mineshaft #25 Sophie Crumb with Robert Crumb (2010)
 Mineshaft #26 Pat Moriarity (2010)
 Mineshaft #27 Nina Bunjevac (2011)
 Mineshaft #28 Christoph Mueller (2012)
 Mineshaft #29 Brad Barrett with logo by Robert Crumb (2013)
 Mineshaft #30 Robert Crumb (15th Anniversary Issue) (2014)
 Mineshaft #31 Jay Lynch (2015)
 Mineshaft #32 Christoph Mueller (2015)
 Mineshaft #33 Mary Fleener (2016)
 Mineshaft #34 Robert Crumb (2016)
 Mineshaft #35 Robert Crumb (Jay Lynch Memorial Issue) (2018)

Awards
In June, 2009, Mineshaft #23 and Jay Lynch were nominated under the category "Best Cover Artist" for a Harvey Award 2009.

 See also 
 Andrei Codrescu reviews Mineshaft #27 in The Exquisite Corpse
 Tom Spurgeon, The Comics Reporter, reviews Mineshaft #26
 "Past and Future: Mineshaft #26",  Review by Rob Clough for Fantagraphics & The Comics Journal "Letters From Old Friends: Mineshaft #25", Review by Rob Clough for Fantagraphics and The Comics Journal''
 "Midnight Snack: Mineshaft #23" Review by Tom Spurgeon in The Comics Reporter
 "Sweeping The Underground: Mineshaft #24" Review by Rob Clough in his "High-Low" comics column 
 The Comics Reporter: Tom Spurgeon reviews Mineshaft #21
 WFMU  Beware of the Blog reviews Mineshaft #18

References

External links 
 Mineshaft official site

1999 establishments in Vermont
Comics publications
Magazines established in 1999
Magazines published in North Carolina
Magazines published in Vermont
Magazines published in West Virginia
Mass media in Durham, North Carolina
Triannual magazines published in the United States
Underground comix
Visual arts magazines published in the United States
Zines